The Saho People's Democratic Movement (SPDM) is a rebel group in Eritrea, fighting for the self-determination of the Saho people. They are allied with the Red Sea Afar Democratic Organisation (RSADO), whom they have done joint operations with.

References 

Guerrilla organizations
National liberation movements in Africa
Rebel groups in Eritrea
Rebel groups in Ethiopia